Didier Ibrahim Ndong (born 17 June 1994) is a Gabonese professional footballer who plays as a midfielder for Ligue 2 club Dijon and the Gabon national team.

Club career

CS Sfaxien
Born in Lambaréné, Gabon, Ndong began his career at Cercle Mbéri Sportif. In 2011, Ndong moved to Tunisia, where he made his professional debut playing for CS Sfaxien during the 2011–12 CLP-1 season. He made his first appearance under then manager Nabil Kouki on 26 September 2012, starting and playing 80' minutes against JS Kairouan before being substituted off, marking his only appearance for the first team that year. The following season, Ndong made more appearances for the first team under newly appointed manager Ruud Krol, while receiving training by former Ajax defender Hatem Trabelsi, he made 12 appearances during the regular season, scoring once against Stade Tunisien on 14 April 2013, playing as an attacking right midfielder for the club from Sfax. He made six further appearances for CS Sfaxien during the playoffs helping his side to win the national championship and their 8th title overall.

Lorient
On 3 January 2015, Ndong signed for Ligue 1 side Lorient on a four-and-a-half year contract.

Sunderland
On 31 August 2016, Ndong signed for Premier League club Sunderland, on a five-year contract, for a club record transfer fee (excluding add-ons) of £13.6 million. He made his debut on 12 September 2016, in a 3–0 defeat to Everton. Ndong was a key member of the Sunderland team in his initial season and scored his first goal for Sunderland, on 4 February 2017 in a 4–0 win over Crystal Palace. The club were later relegated to the Championship for the first time in ten years, following a 1–0 loss to Bournemouth at the Stadium of Light on 29 April 2017. He initially stayed with Sunderland following their relegation to the Championship playing regularly. On 13 January 2018, he was sent off for a straight red card against Cardiff City in what would be his final appearance for Sunderland ahead of his loan to Watford.

Loan to Watford
Ndong signed for Premier League Watford on loan on 31 January 2018 during the January Transfer Window. Although signed on a loan, Watford had an option to sign the midfielder on a permanent basis. He was suspended for his first game, following a red card in his final game for Sunderland. However, after the suspension ended, he still did not play for Watford and was an unused substitute only three times during his disappointing four-month loan spell.

Dismissal
Sunderland were relegated to EFL League One at the end of the 2017–18 season and a number of high-profile players, including Ndong, expressed their desire to leave the club rather than play in England's third tier. In May 2018, Sunderland was bought by Stewart Donald who talked publicly about his intention to get fair prices for outgoing players. Through the summer transfer window of 2018, Ndong was linked to a number of clubs, including Fiorentina, Benfica and Torino, the latter of which agreed a £6.6m fee for the player, but Ndong's personal demands proved to be a stumbling block. By the time the players were due to return for pre-season training on 2 July, a move had not materialised. Ndong failed to report to the club's training ground as expected, resulting in the club withholding the player's wages. Ndong remained absent from the club for the remainder of pre-season and the early matches of the 2018–19 season. Sunderland fans' feelings toward the club's record signing became increasingly hostile, made worse when Ndong appeared to post an image on Instagram of him sitting poolside at a holiday resort.

A similar situation was unfolding with teammate Papy Djilobodji who had also failed to return to training while trying to engineer a move away from Sunderland. When Djilobodji did eventually return to the club, he was almost immediately sacked for alleged breach of contract. Djilobodji had reached an agreement with the club to remain absent during July (with a proviso that he keep himself fit), but he returned for training late and failed a series of fitness tests. The parallels with the Ndong situation were noted at the time of Djilobodji's sacking, with public comments from Stewart Donald suggesting that the players were "deliberately devaluing themselves" in order to engineer cheaper moves away from the club. Donald hinted that legal proceedings could follow.

After the Djilobodji sacking, attention turned to Ndong, who was still absent from the club. Reports in Gabon suggested Ndong feared the repercussions of a return to North East England, including possible arrest (the grounds on which he feared he would be arrested were not made clear). Ndong's representatives suggested the player was considering commissioning a negotiator to represent him in discussions with the club. On 21 September, Ndong reportedly issued a statement via representatives that he had been spending time in Morocco, but wished to return to Sunderland to fight for his place in the team. He offered to take a pay cut. Ndong returned to the club on 24 September and, following a brief meeting with the club management, was served notice for breach of contract.

A statement from Sunderland, released on the club's official website stated:

Following his sacking, Ndong had to leave the United Kingdom due to his residence permit expiring. He returned to Gabon and began training with an unnamed club in Libreville in October 2018, amid reports of personal financial difficulties. On 11 October 2018, Sunderland released a statement on their website indicating that an amicable agreement had been reached and Ndong was no longer an employee of the club. The statement indicated that Sunderland would receive compensation when Ndong signed for a new club.

Guingamp
On 28 December 2018, En Avant Guingamp announced that they were due to sign Ndong, following medical exams and finalising a deal with Sunderland. He was officially presented on 4 January 2019.

Dijon

Loan to Yeni Malatyaspor
On 26 August 2021, he joined Turkish club Yeni Malatyaspor on a season-long loan. On 10 March 2022, he loan was terminated early by mutual consent.

International career
On 14 November 2012, Ndong made his debut for Gabon in a 2–2 draw against Portugal.

In 2013, Anicet Yala, coach of the Gabon national U20 team, called him up to be a member of the squad for the 2013 African Youth Championship in Algeria.

Career statistics

Honours
CS Sfaxien
 CLP-1: 2012–13
 CAF Confederation Cup: 2013

Gabon U23
CAF U-23 Championship:2011

References

External links

Living people
1993 births
People from Lambaréné
Gabonese footballers
Association football midfielders
Gabon international footballers
Gabon youth international footballers
Ligue 1 players
Ligue 2 players
Premier League players
English Football League players
Süper Lig players
CS Sfaxien players
FC Lorient players
Sunderland A.F.C. players
Watford F.C. players
En Avant Guingamp players
Dijon FCO players
Yeni Malatyaspor footballers
2013 African U-20 Championship players
2015 Africa Cup of Nations players
2017 Africa Cup of Nations players
Gabonese expatriate footballers
Expatriate footballers in Tunisia
Expatriate footballers in France
Expatriate footballers in England
Expatriate footballers in Turkey
Gabonese expatriate sportspeople in Tunisia
Gabonese expatriate sportspeople in France
Gabonese expatriate sportspeople in England
Gabonese expatriate sportspeople in Turkey
21st-century Gabonese people